Henry Jiun-Hsien Yao is a Canadian politician who was elected to the Legislative Assembly of British Columbia in the 2020 British Columbia general election. He represents the electoral district of Richmond South Centre as a member of the British Columbia New Democratic Party (BC NDP).

Biography
Born in Taiwan, Yao immigrated to Canada at the age of 11, settling in Richmond, British Columbia. After graduating from Matthew McNair Secondary School, he studied at the University of British Columbia, from which he received a bachelor of arts degree in psychology. He was diagnosed with two types of lymphoma in 2004; after his cancer went into remission, he pursued a career in youth work.

He ran for Richmond City Council twice: the first time in 2014 as an independent candidate, then in 2018 as part of RITE Richmond. Both attempts were unsuccessful.

In the 2020 provincial election, Yao ran in the riding of Richmond South Centre as an NDP candidate, against Alexa Loo of the Liberals. He defeated Loo by a margin of 179 votes, becoming a member of the Legislative Assembly.

Electoral record

Provincial elections

Municipal elections 
 Top 8 candidates elected — Incumbents marked with "(X)". Elected members' names are in bold

References

21st-century Canadian politicians
British Columbia New Democratic Party MLAs
Living people
Year of birth missing (living people)
Taiwanese emigrants to Canada
People from Richmond, British Columbia
Canadian politicians of Chinese descent
University of British Columbia alumni